The International Council for Open and Distance Education (ICDE) is a membership-led global organization in the field of online, open, flexible and technology enhanced education. It consists of more than 200 higher education institutions and organizations in some 84 countries.

Founded in 1938, the International Council for Open and Distance Education (ICDE) has its permanent secretariat in Oslo, Norway. It is currently partly funded by a grant from the Government of Norway and has been hosted in Oslo since 1988.

Since 1960 ICDE has a partnership with UNESCO.

ICDE is a registered not-for-profit organization in Norway, operating under Norwegian law.

History

ICDE was founded in 1938 in Canada as the International Council for Correspondence Education (ICCE). The first World Conference was held in Victoria, British Columbia, Canada the same year.
The idea for holding an international conference came from J. W. Gibson director of high school correspondence instruction for the province of British Columbia, who attended the National Conference on Supervised Correspondence Study in New York in 1936. Gibson shared with other delegates knowledge he had about correspondence education in several countries and then suggested that an international conference be held. Rex Haight, chair of the New York conference, supported the idea and later served as president for the first conference.

At the second conference, held in 1948, the delegates voted unanimously to establish a more permanent international council.

At the third conference, held in 1953 in Christchurch, New Zealand, a committee presented a proposed "Constitution and Rules" for the council that was adopted by the delegates. These rules helped the council became more established and conferences began to follow a more regular schedule.

In 1969 the 8th World Conference was held at the UNESCO headquarters in Paris to celebrate the affiliation with UNESCO.

In 1982 during the 12th World Conference held in Vancouver, the organization changed its name to "the International Council for Open and Distance Education" (ICDE).

In 1988 during the 14th ICDE World Conference held in Oslo, the King of Norway His Majesty King Olav V and the Norwegian Prime Minister Gro Harlem Brundtland both attended. This conference led to the establishment of the permamenent secretariat in Oslo.

Membership

ICDE is a membership organization with 10 different types of memberships: Individuals, Students, Associations, Colleges and Universities, Companies, Educational networks, Governmental organizations, Non-Governmental organizations, Secondary Schools.

World Conference
Since 2000 ICDE World Conference are organized biannually and on a different continent each time. The conference is traditionally organized at the invitation of an ICDE member.

Presidents

The first 10 years of the council the presidence was led by Rex Haight in Canada who was also the chair of the first ICCE World Conference held in Victoria in 1938. Since 1948 the presidency of the council has been limited to a maximum of 5 years.

Publications
ICDE regularly publishes or contributes to reports, surveys and articles on the following topics: Quality in Education; Online Education; Flexible Education; Elearning; Lifelong Learning; Higher Education; Distance Education; Open Education and OER (Open educational resources); Alternative Digital Credentials; Learning Analytics; Education Policies; Research and Innovation in Education; etc.

ICDE publishes the Open Praxis journal, a peer-reviewed open access scholarly journal focusing on research and innovation in open, distance and flexible education.

References

External links 
 

International educational organizations
Distance education institutions based in Norway